Major Tom is a persona of David Bowie's, referenced in  songs "Space Oddity", "Ashes to Ashes", "Hallo Spaceboy", and "Blackstar." Bowie's own interpretation of the character evolved throughout his career. "Space Oddity" (1969) depicts an astronaut who casually slips the bonds of the world to journey beyond the stars. In the song "Ashes to Ashes" (1980), Bowie reinterprets Major Tom as an oblique autobiographical symbol for himself. Major Tom is described as a "junkie, strung out in heaven's high, hitting an all-time low". This lyric was interpreted as a play on the title of Bowie's album Low (1977), which was inspired by the withdrawal symptoms he suffered while undergoing treatment for drug addiction. Additionally, the choked and self-recriminating tone used in the lyrics "Time and again I tell myself I'll stay clean tonight" reinforces an autobiographical and retrospective interpretation. A short time later, there is another reversal of Major Tom's original withdrawal, turning 'outwards' or towards space.

German singer Peter Schilling retold and continued the story of Major Tom in his late 1982 release "Major Tom (völlig losgelöst)", which reached number one in Germany and Austria in early 1983. The English-language version, "Major Tom (Coming Home)", peaked at number 14 in the United States in late 1983. Other artists who have subsequently made substantial contributions to the Major Tom story include K.I.A. ("Mrs. Major Tom"). Due to some similarities in Elton John's "Rocket Man", there is a possible connection between the Rocket Man and Major Tom, a connection notably made by Bowie himself, who while singing "Space Oddity" in concert would sometimes call out, "Oh, Rocket Man!"

Major Tom in Bowie's work
In "Space Oddity", from the album David Bowie (1969, later retitled Space Oddity), Major Tom's departure from Earth is successful and everything goes according to plan. At a certain point during the travel ('past one hundred thousand miles'), he claims that "he feels very still" and thinks that "my spaceship knows which way to go" and proceeds to say: "Tell my wife I love her very much." Control then informs him: "Ground Control to Major Tom: your circuit's dead, there's something wrong" and attempts to reestablish contact with Major Tom. Tom's final words in the song (possibly not heard by Ground Control) are: "Here am I floating 'round my tin can, far above the moon. Planet Earth is blue, and there's nothing I can do."

In the promotional film from 1969, David Bowie plays as Major Tom, Ground Control (GC), and the Countdown Announcer. When the lyrics "And the stars look very different today" are said, two women appear, portraying either angels or aliens, or perhaps both. The moment "Though I'm past one hundred thousand miles, I'm feeling very still" are said, the two women can be seen removing Major Tom's helmet and spacesuit. Later, a still fully outfitted Major Tom can be seen spinning around in space, with a panicked Ground Control attempting to contact him; the spinning Major Tom is either the reality of the situation, or Ground Control's imagination. The music video ends with Major Tom sitting in his "tin can", far above the world, with the two women by him in a ménage à trois formation.

Bowie created a sequel entitled "Ashes to Ashes" (1980). The song, which peaked at Number 1 in the UK music charts and had a respectable showing in other international music charts, was featured on his LP Scary Monsters (And Super Creeps). The song actually says little about Major Tom, except to call him a "junkie"; The context of the lyrics seems to indicate that the song is mainly about Bowie's own experiences with drug addiction, rather than a literal continuation of the Major Tom story.

Alternatively, the song can be interpreted to provide detailed information on Tom's story. The song refers an event happening much later, after "Space Oddity". Ground control receives a message from the "Action Man", referring to Tom, and he says: "I've loved all I've needed to love. Sordid details following..." He talks about how the shrieking of nothing is killing him, how all he has are his pictures of women to keep him company, and how he now has neither money nor hair. He wants to stop, but the planet is "glowing"; essentially he cannot quit whatever is influencing him—and killing him—because the feeling is too pleasurable and addictive. The exact source of the influence is not defined. The later verses seem to reflect more on Bowie's literal battle with addiction, specifically about wanting to stay clean but being stuck with a "valuable friend". The song again refers directly to Tom toward the end, where he has become more of a legend, but not for his heroics. He has become a nursery rhyme in the minds of the public, with mothers warning against drug use by telling their children if they want: "...to get things done, you'd better not mess with Major Tom."

Bowie released a song entitled "Hallo Spaceboy" on his album Outside (1995). While this song itself does not directly reference Major Tom, references to Major Tom do appear in the remixed version that Bowie released with the Pet Shop Boys in 1996. This remix contains lyrics from "Space Oddity" that are sung by Pet Shop Boys vocalist Neil Tennant.

Although never mentioned in the song, an astronaut, possibly Major Tom, does make an appearance in the music video for the song "Slow Burn" on Bowie's 2002 album Heathen. The same album also contains a cover of Legendary Stardust Cowboy's I Took a Trip on a Gemini Spaceship, again hinting a metaphoric connection between space journeys and drug use.

In the music video of Bowie's 2015 song "Blackstar" (on the album of the same name, released in 2016 two days prior to his death), a dead astronaut is depicted. His jewel-encrusted skull is retrieved by an alien female who takes it back to what could be considered a cult which subsequently worships the relic. This astronaut was speculated to be a depiction of Major Tom's final fate. Video director Johan Renck said on a BBC documentary "to me, it was 100% Major Tom". That cites an interview which was only available in the UK on the date of access.

Other references in popular culture
Canadian astronaut Chris Hadfield performed "Space Oddity" on board the International Space Station (ISS). With the express permission of Bowie it was released on YouTube on 13 May 2013. This was the first music video to be made in space.

In 2013, Drum Corps International (DCI) world class corps Carolina Crown created a show that told a story of Major Tom. The show went on tour in 2014 and is called "Out of This World" it includes quotations from David Bowie's own music. During the show Major Tom is communicating with Ground Control (GC) for the launch. Once in orbit Major Tom sees a shining spinning object in the distance and promptly loses contact with GC. At the end of the show Major Tom regains contact with GC and enters earth's atmosphere and is back home. 

British astronaut Timothy Peake was regularly referred to by the media as "Major Tim", during his tour of duty on board the ISS, 15 December 2015 - 18 June 2016, (Expeditions 46 and 47).  This was a direct reference to Bowie's fictional astronaut. Peake was on the ISS at the time of Bowie's death and tweeted a tribute to him from there.  In 2017, author Clive Gifford wrote a book aimed at children about Peake's time on board the ISS, titled "Ground Control to Major Tim: The Space Adventures of Major Tim Peake".

Video game designer, director, and producer Hideo Kojima's admiration for Bowie inspired several elements in the Metal Gear series. In the first mission of Metal Gear Solid 3: Snake Eater, the character Major Zero codenames himself Major Tom.

In season 3 episode 13 of Rugrats, "Destination Moon", Tommy says, "This is Major Tom, to ground control, requesting permission for lift off". This is in reference to the song "Space Oddity".

In The Venture Bros. season 1 episode "Ghosts of the Sargasso", a character named Major Tom had a major role in the plot. He first appeared in the opening scene in a flashback as having been a pilot who died in 1969 after TVC 15, an experimental aircraft which shares the name with another song by David Bowie, was piloting crashed into the ocean within the Bermuda Triangle, and his ghost later appears in the present in the episode. In addition, the opening scene's dialogue references lyrics from both "Space Oddity" and "Ashes to Ashes", and the episode introduces recurring character The Action Man, his name itself a reference to a lyric in the latter song. The show contains many other references to Bowie's work, including Bowie "himself" in several episodes.

In series 8 episode 3 of the British space comedy Red Dwarf, "Back in the Red: Part 3," the protagonists attempt to escape from a landing bay. Cat activates the intercom and says, "Ground control, this is uh..." at which point Lister suggests "Major Tom!" and Cat confirms "Yeah, Major Tom!"

The song "Terrence Loves You" by Lana Del Rey, whose meaning is speculated by fans to be about David Bowie's brother Terry Burns, contains the lyrics "Ground Control to Major Tom / Can you hear me all night long?" in its bridge.

In the animated series Chaotic the main protagonist, Tom Majors, is also known by his online handle "MajorTom".

In The Cab's song "Angel with a Shotgun" one line is "And Major Tom, will sing along, yeah they still say I'm a dreamer."

References

External links 
 Analysis of Schilling's "Major Tom (Coming Home)"

 
David Bowie
Fictional astronauts
Fictional characters introduced in 1969
Fictional drug addicts
Fictional majors
Fictional characters invented for recorded music